Duh Aghli (also Romanized as Dūh Āghlī) is a village in Bastam Rural District, in the Central District of Chaypareh County, West Azerbaijan Province, Iran. At the 2006 census, its population was 17, in 4 families.

References 

Populated places in Chaypareh County